Pseudomoraria is a genus of copepods in the family Canthocamptidae. It is monotypic being represented by the single species Pseudomoraria triglavensis. It is listed as a vulnerable species on the IUCN Red List.

See also
Triglav

References

Harpacticoida
Freshwater crustaceans of Europe
Monotypic arthropod genera
Endemic fauna of Slovenia
Taxonomy articles created by Polbot